Ricardo Villar may refer to:

 Ricardo Villar (Argentine footballer) (born 1989), Argentine footballer for Cremonese
 Ricardo Villar (Brazilian footballer) (born 1979), Brazilian footballer for FC Dallas

See also
 Ricardo Vilar (born 1985), Brazilian football goalkeeper